David Hoppe may refer to:

 John David Hoppe (born 1951), known as Dave, Capitol Hill politician and lobbyist
 David Heinrich Hoppe (1760–1846), German pharmacist, botanist, entomologist and physician